"Cosmik Debris" is a song by American composer Frank Zappa, from his 1974 album Apostrophe (').

It concerns the Mystery Man, a typical guru or psychic, offering to help the narrator reach Nervanna [sic] for a "nominal service charge," and the narrator's refusal to buy into his act, "Look here, brother, who you jiving with that cosmik debris?" When the Mystery Man gets pushy, Zappa as the narrator tells how he snatched the crystal ball, hypnotized the Mystery Man, stole his stuff and blew his mind.

The song was popular on the Dr. Demento Show in the 1970s, and in Zappa's concerts, with memorable guitar solos from Zappa, also featuring George Duke on keyboard and Napoleon Murphy Brock on sax. The song was featured in the late-2010 Zappa Plays Zappa tour, where through video and editing (from 1970s-era shows), Frank Zappa on a large video screen both sang and played a guitar solo while the ZPZ band provided a live backing. This song was also a B-side to the single "Don't Eat the Yellow Snow."

Connections to previous Zappa songs

References of previous songs are frequent in many Frank Zappa songs. "Cosmik Debris" shares the lyric "Now is that a real poncho or is that a Sears poncho?" which is a reference to the song "Camarillo Brillo" from the previous album "Over-Nite Sensation. "The "dust of The Grand Wazoo" is also mentioned in the lyrics and refers to the album released by Zappa in 1972.

Track list
A-side "Don't Eat The Yellow Snow" – 3:26 (Contains Don't Eat The Yellow Snow, Nanook Rubs it and the intro to St. Alfonzo's Pancake Breakfast)

B-side "Cosmik Debris" – 4:10

Notes and references

1974 singles
1974 songs
Frank Zappa songs
Satirical songs
Songs written by Frank Zappa
Comedy rock songs
Jazz fusion songs
 Song recordings produced by Frank Zappa